Ploufragan is a commune in the Côtes-d'Armor department of Brittany in northwestern France.

Ploufragan lies adjacent to the southwest of Saint-Brieuc, the prefecture and largest city of Côtes-d'Armor.

Population

Inhabitants of Ploufragan are called ploufraganais in French.

See also
Communes of the Côtes-d'Armor department

References

External links

Communes of Côtes-d'Armor